Golden Coast may refer to:

 Coastal California
 Golden Coast Conference, collegiate women's water polo conference
 Costa Daurada, an area on the coast of Catalonia, Spain
Côte-d'Or, a department of France; translation meaning Golden Coast
Golden Coast (album), an album by Flow
Golden Coast, a video by John-Allison Weiss

See also
 Gold Coast (disambiguation)